Bet Israel Synagogue may refer to:
 Bet Israel Synagogue (Belgrade)
 Bet Israel Synagogue (Istanbul)
 Bet Israel Synagogue (Izmir)